Miguel Palmer, stage name of Miguel Ángel Palomera Gonzali (1 November 1942 – 18 October 2021) was a Mexican actor.

Filmography

Mundo de juguete (1974)
Mundos opuestos (1976)
Rina (1977)
Pasiones encendidas (1978)
Viviana (1978)
Los ricos también lloran (1979)
Una mujer marcada (1979)
Al rojo vivo (1980)
Al final del arco iris (1982)
Bodas de odio (1983)
El maleficio (1983)
Herencia maldita (1986)
Senda de gloria (1987)
Milagro y magia (1991)
Marimar (1994)
Amigas y rivales (2001)
Dos hogares (2011)
Señora Acero (2014)
Sr. Ávila (2018)

Awards

Winner of TVyNovelas Award for Best Antagonist Actor (1983)
Nomination for TVyNovelas Award for Best Actor (1984)

References

1942 births
2021 deaths
Mexican male actors
People from Villahermosa
Male actors from Tabasco